The Battle of Strömstad took place on July 19, 1717 at Strömstad during the Great Northern War. The Swedish army of about 1,800 men under the command of Johan Giertta defeated the Danish fleet of several larger vessels and perhaps 4,000 men under Peder Tordenskjold. Peter tried to destroy the stocks of supplies Sweden had gathered for the upcoming invasion of Norway. In the battle about 200 Swedes were either dead or wounded and about 350 Norwegians.

Battle
On the night of July 8, the Norwegian ships were thrown towards Strömstad harbor, where they anchored up at 4 o'clock in the morning and began shelling the harbor fortifications. The liner ships concentrated on Laholmen and the barges on the other batteries. After a few hours of artillery preparation, six galleries were sent in to disembark on Laholmen. However, the defense was not defeated and only two galleys managed to be placed on the beach, where they could be damaged by Swedish infantry. Tordenskjold himself was wounded in the leg and the Norwegians were forced to withdraw with a loss of 350 men. The Swedish losses should have been considerably smaller.

Aftermath
The Swedes managed to defend their connecting lines for the army's operations in Norway. After the two unsuccessful attacks on Gothenburg and Strömstad in 1717, Tordenskjold was deprived of command of the Danish navy in the Kattegat for 1718 and subjected to the Schoutby night Rosenpalm.

The successful defense of Gothenburg and Strömstad again strengthened the Swedes' confidence after the previous defeats. The Danish North Sea Squadron henceforth remained more in the shadows and limited its operations to purely defensive companies. Swedish ships could soon go undisturbed between Gothenburg and Strömstad, at least if they had coverage.

References

 Knut Lundblad, Georg Friedrich Jenssen-Tusch: Geschichte Karl des Zwölften, Königs von Schweden, Band 2, Hamburg (1835). pp. 542–547.

Stromstad
Conflicts in 1717
Stromstad 1717
Stromstad 1717